Shahrak-e Nur Mohammadi (also Romanized as Shahrak-e Nūr Moḩammadī; also known as Shahrak-e Shahīd Pūr Moḩammadī) is a village in Miyan Ab-e Shomali Rural District, in the Central District of Shushtar County, Khuzestan Province, Iran. At the 2006 census, its population was 4,256, in 800 families.

References 

Populated places in Shushtar County

ru:Шахрак-э-Нур-Мохаммади